Ganga is a 1960 Bengali drama film directed by Rajen Tarafdar. This film narrates the life of river fishermen. This film was based on the 1946 same name novel of Samaresh Basu and made under Cine Art Productions Pvt. Ltd. banner. The music of this film was composed by Salil Chowdhury.

Plot 

Panchu is a fisherman. His young nephew Bilash joins the profession who is very short tempered. He wants to go to sea and capture fish there. But Panchu is scared of it and does not want to allow Bilash to do so. He arranges the marriage of Bilash with Gardi who used to do fishing in Ichamati river.

Cast 
 Gyanesh Mukherjee
 Sandhya Roy
 Ruma Guha Thakurta
 Moni Srimani
 Niranjan Ray
 Sita Mukhopadhyay
 Md. Israil
 Namita Singha
 Sumana Bhattacharya
 Suruchi Sengupta

References

External links 

1960 films
Bengali-language Indian films
1960s Bengali-language films
Films based on works by Samaresh Basu
Indian drama films